Brian Hutchison is an American actor based in New York City. He has appeared on such network shows as Blue Bloods, Madam Secretary, Chicago Med, Jessica Jones, Elementary, Law & Order: Special Victims Unit, Godfather of Harlem, The Sinner, FBI: Most Wanted and Lisey's Story.

He has appeared on and off Broadway in several shows including Exit the King with Geoffrey Rush, Looped opposite Valerie Harper, and Man and Boy with Frank Langella. Hutchison has also performed at major regional theaters throughout the Northeast and on the West Coast.

In 2018, Hutchison played the part of Alan in the Tony Award-winning revival of The Boys in the Band on Broadway. Directed by Joe Mantello, the cast included Jim Parsons, Zachary Quinto, Matt Bomer, Andrew Rannells, Tuc Watkins, Charlie Carver, Robin de Jesus, and Michael Benjamin Washington. The full cast reprised their roles in a movie version of the play that was filmed in 2019 and released on Netflix in September 2020.

In addition to acting, Hutchison is also a SOVA award-winning narrator who has recorded over 150 audio books for Audible. He is also a professional photographer, specializing in shooting publicity head shots for other actors. 
His portfolio also includes a wide range of candid portraits, landscapes and architectural detail.

Education
Hutchison graduated from Sewickley Academy in 1989 and received a BA in English from Lafayette College in 1993 and earned his Master of Fine Arts at the University of San Diego. 
While in graduate school, he met director Jack O'Brien, who cast him in the title role of Brendan Behan's The Hostage at San Diego's Old Globe Theater. After graduating, he returned to the Old Globe and appeared in All My Sons and Blue/Orange.

Personal life
Hutchison married real estate agent Ron Maggio in 2018 and they split their time between New York City and East Hampton. His brother, Chris Hutchison, is also an actor and a company member with Houston's Alley Theatre in Texas.

Stage

Broadway

Off Broadway

Regional

Filmography

Film

Television

Audiobooks
He has voiced over 150+ audiobooks for four major companies: Audible, Recorded Books, Blackstone Audio, and Simon & Schuster.

See also
 LGBT culture in New York City
 List of LGBT people from New York City

References

External links 

 Brian Hutchison at Broadway World.com
 Brian Hutchison at Theatermania

Living people
Lafayette College alumni
University of San Diego alumni
American male stage actors
American gay actors
Place of birth missing (living people)
Year of birth missing (living people)
American male television actors
Male actors from New York City
21st-century LGBT people